Crypsotidia gigantea is a moth of the family Erebidae. It is found in Tanzania and Ethiopia.

References

Moths described in 2005
Crypsotidia